Novoselivka is a village located in Podilsk Raion of Odesa Oblast, Ukraine. It belongs to Ananiv urban hromada, one of the hromadas of Ukraine. 

Until 18 July 2020, Novoselivka belonged to Ananiv Raion. The raion was abolished in July 2020 as part of the administrative reform of Ukraine, which reduced the number of raions of Odesa Oblast to seven. The area of Ananiv Raion was merged into Podilsk Raion.

References

Villages in Podilsk Raion